A number of steamships were named Athelstane, including-
 , a cargo ship in service 1872–92
 , a tanker in service 1935–42
 , a tanker in service 1922–26
 , a coastal tanker in service 1928–35
 , a tanker in service 1941–45

Ship names